Ralph Wilde is an academic and expert in public international law. He is a faculty member at University College London (UCL). His 2008 book International Territorial Administration: How Trusteeship and The Civilizing Mission Never Went Away—examining international territorial administration]] in consideration of Third World approaches to international law and postcolonial theory—was published by Oxford University Press.

Education 
1995 Bachelor of Science London School of Economics
1996 Diploma University of London
1998 European Human Rights Law from the European University Institute
1999 Master of Laws from Cambridge University
2000 Master of Arts University of London
2003 Doctor of Laws (Ph.D.) Cambridge University

Career 
In 2002 Wilde became a member of University College London Faculty of Laws. He is a public law expert, specializing in international law. He also studies "human rights beyond borders". He has published many papers regarding international law and human rights.

He won an award for his 2008 book, International Territorial Administration: How Trusteeship and The Civilizing Mission Never Went Away. In 2009 he was awarded the Certificate of Merit from the American Society of International Law.

References

Bibliography

External links 
Dr Ralph Wilde's presentation on the global refugee crisis

Living people
Academics of University College London
International law scholars
Year of birth missing (living people)